Henssenia is a genus of lichen-forming fungi in the family Koerberiaceae. It has four species. The genus was circumscribed in 2017 by Damien Ertz, Roar Skovlund Poulsen, and Ulrik Søchting, with Henssenia glaucella assigned as the type species. The main distinguishing characteristic of the genus is simple ascospores (i.e., lacking septa) that sometimes have a plasma bridge. The genus name honours German lichenologist Aino Henssen.

Species
 Henssenia glaucella 
 Henssenia radiata 
 Henssenia subglaucella 
 Henssenia werthii

References

Peltigerales
Taxa described in 2017
Lichen genera
Peltigerales genera